The 1828 United States presidential election in Pennsylvania took place between October 31 and December 2, 1828, as part of the 1828 United States presidential election. Voters chose 28 representatives, or electors to the Electoral College, who voted for President and Vice President.

Pennsylvania voted for the Democratic candidate, Andrew Jackson, over the National Republican candidate, John Quincy Adams. Jackson won Pennsylvania by a margin of 33.32%.

Even 195 years later, this was the Democratic Party's best performance in Pennsylvania as of 2020. It was also the last time Union County, Pennsylvania voted Democratic.

Results

References

Pennsylvania
1828
1828 Pennsylvania elections